Pierre-Nicolas Lahalle (Epreville, 1 April 1772 - Roscoff, 5 August 1828) was a French naval officer.

Career 
In 1809, he captained the 40-gun frigate Topaze. She was captured during the action of 22 January 1809.

In late 1812, he commanded the frigate Hortense.

Sources and references

Notes

References

Bibliography 

 Fonds Marine. Campagnes (opérations ; divisions et stations navales ; missions diverses). Inventaire de la sous-série Marine BB4. Tome premier : BB4 1 à 482 (1790-1826) 
 
 

1772 births
1828 deaths
French Navy officers
French naval commanders of the Napoleonic Wars